Kaajal Pasupathi is an Indian actress of the Tamil film industry. She had roles in the films  Ko (2011), Mouna Guru  (2011) and Katham Katham (2015).

Career
She began her career in entertainment as a video jockey with the Sun Music channel, before moving on to work in television serials. Her first film appearance came through Sasi's Dishyum (2006), where she portrayed Sandhya's friend. She was subsequently cast in several roles as a vamp, a police officer or in glamorous roles. Her most notable work in films including  Ko (2011), Mouna Guru  (2011), Katham Katham (2015) and Aayirathil Iruvar (2017). In 2012, she signed up for a film titled Maadathi directed by Nagarajan, which would have featured her in the lead role of a don in Chennai slums but the film did not begin its shoot. Several films she has shot remain unreleased including Krishna's Yen Ippadi Mayakkinai, P. V. Prasad's Sakunthalavin Kadhalan, the Sarathkumar-starrer Velachery, the Vivek-starrer Thuppariyum Shankar, the Richa Pallod-starrer Nalvaravu and the Sanchita Shetty-starrer Love Guru.

In 2017, she appeared as a contestant on the television show Bigg Boss hosted by Kamal Haasan. She entered on day 54 of the show and was evicted on day 70.

Personal life
During her stint on the dance reality show Maanada Mayilada, she briefly dated choreographer Sandy. In 2019, she announced her intentions of adopting a child as a single mother.

Filmography

Films

Television 
Sindhubadh (2005-2006) 
Kasthuri (2006-2012)
Arasi (2007-2009)
Maanada Mayilada (2007)
Bigg Boss (2017) - Evicted day 70
Sun Kudumbam Viruthugal (2019)

Online
 Galatta Tamil as Host

References

External links

Indian film actresses
Living people
Actresses in Tamil cinema
Actresses in Telugu cinema
21st-century Indian actresses
Actresses in Tamil television
Bigg Boss (Tamil TV series) contestants
1979 births